Good Time (stylized in all caps) is the debut album of American country music artist Niko Moon. It was released on August 27, 2021, via RCA Records Nashville.

Content
Prior to releasing his debut album, Moon worked as a songwriter for various country music artists, including Zac Brown Band and Dierks Bentley. He also recorded with the former's Zac Brown in the electronic dance music trio Sir Rosevelt.

Moon released "Good Time" as his debut single in 2020, and the song reached the top of Billboard Hot Country Songs and Country Airplay charts in 2021. He wrote all but one of the album's songs with his wife, Anna, and Joshua Murty, with whom he also produced the album. The final track, and the only one which the Moons did not co-write, is a cover of Travis Tritt's 2001 single "It's a Great Day to Be Alive".

Critical reception
Michael Rampa of Country Standard Time gave the album a mixed review, stating that "It is not as if the material is poorly written or the melodies displeasing, given Moon's expectations of positivity but it feels like these songs would fare better in the hands of a jam band outfit like Zac Brown Band that would certainly make it sound more country. But that was not what Moon was going for anyway."

Track listing

Personnel
Credits adapted from the album's liner notes.

Musicians
Niko Moon – lead vocals, background vocals, gang vocals, programming, acoustic guitar
Joshua Murty – acoustic guitar, electric guitar, keyboards, piano, ganjo, banjo, mandolin, bouzouki, nylon string guitar, pedal steel guitar, programming, hand claps, background vocals, gang vocals
Derek Wells – acoustic guitar, electric guitar, dobro, banjo, ganjo, mandolin, bouzouki, baritone guitar
Ian Fitchuk – B-3 organ, piano
Brandon Hood – dobro, ganjo, mandolin
Russ Pahl – pedal steel guitar
Justin Schipper – pedal steel guitar
Bryan Sutton – acoustic guitar
Chris McHugh – percussion
Phil Lawson – percussion
Jason Kyle Saetveit – background vocals
Noel Bisesti – background vocals, gang vocals

Production
Joshua Murty – producer, engineering, digital editing
Niko Moon – producer, engineering
Andrew Boullianne – assistant engineering
Trey Keller – digital editing
Jon Castelli – mixing
Josh Deguzman – mix engineer
Dale Becker – mastering
Hector Vega – audio engineer
Fili Filizzola – audio engineer
Connor Hedge – audio engineer

Chart performance

References

2021 debut albums
Niko Moon albums
RCA Records albums